Street Machine is the fourth studio album by American rock vocalist Sammy Hagar, released in September 1979 by Capitol Records. The album peaked at number 71 on the Billboard 200 album charts on October 20, 1979.

Song information
 The track "Wounded in Love" was co-written by Hagar's then-wife Betsy.
 "Falling in Love" has backing vocals by Brad Delp, Barry Goudreau and Sib Hashian of the group Boston.
 "This Planet's on Fire (Burn in Hell)" was later covered by Megadeth and included on certain editions of their sixteenth studio album, The Sick, the Dying... and the Dead! Hagar sang vocals on the recording.

Track listing
All songs written by Sammy Hagar, except where noted.

 "Growing Pains" – 3:46
 "Child to Man" – 4:28
 "Trans Am (Highway Wonderland)" – 3:46
 "Feels Like Love" – 4:21
 "Plain Jane" – 3:49
 "Never Say Die" – 4:47
 "This Planet's on Fire (Burn in Hell)" – 4:34
 "Wounded in Love" (Betsy Hagar, Sammy Hagar) – 3:50
 "Falling in Love" – 4:44
 "Straight to the Top" – 3:29

Personnel
 Sammy Hagar – guitar, lead vocals
 Bill Church – bass guitar, background vocals
 Gary Pihl – guitar, background vocals
 Chuck Ruff – drums, background vocals
 Steve Douglas – saxophone
 Mark Jordan – piano

Reissues
 The 1996 One Way Records re-release includes a bonus live track, "Miles from Boredom", which was recorded at the Long Beach Arena in Long Beach, California, on July 13, 1980. This was a previously unreleased track from the recordings that were released on Live 1980.
 On May 26, 2009, Rock Candy records re-released the album as a "Collector's Edition: Remaster & Reloaded". The collection contains extensive liner notes, photos and bonus tracks from a 1979 non-album single, "(Sittin' On) The Dock Of The Bay" and "I've Done Everything for You".

Singles
 "Plain Jane" (mono) b/w "Plain Jane" (stereo) - US (Capitol P-4757)
 "Plain Jane" (mono) b/w "Plain Jane" (stereo) - US (Capitol PRO-9189/9190)
 "Plain Jane" b/w "Wounded in Love" - UK (Capitol CL 16101)
 "This Planet's on Fire (Burn in Hell)" b/w "Space Station #5" (live) - UK (Capitol CL 16114)
 "Straight to the Top" b/w "Growing Pains" - US (Capitol 4825)

Releases
 Capitol (US) : ST-11983
 Capitol (Japan) : ECS-81278
 Revolver (1986 UK reissue) : REV LP 72
 Capitol (US) : CDP 748433 2
 BGO (1992 UK reissue) : BGOCD150
 One Way Records (1996 reissue) : 72438 19092 25
 Capitol (1996 Japan reissue) : TOCP-8344
 Rock Candy Records (2009 reissue) : CANDY052

References

External links
 www.redrockerdiscography.com Red Rock discography

Sammy Hagar albums
1979 albums
Capitol Records albums